Mark Richardson may refer to:

 Mark Richardson (sprinter) (born 1972), British Olympic sprinter
 Mark Richardson (cricketer) (born 1971), New Zealand ex-cricketer, turned sports commentator and journalist
 Mark Richardson (footballer) (born 1972), Australian rules footballer
 Mark Richardson (ice hockey) (born 1986), English ice hockey player
 Mark Richardson (musician) (born 1970), drummer for the band Skunk Anansie and formerly Feeder
 Mark Richardson (politician) (born 1952), minority leader in the Missouri House of Representatives
 Mark Richardson (American football), American businessman and co-owner of the Carolina Panthers